Santo Antônio do Aracanguá is a municipality in the northwestern part of the state of São Paulo, Brazil. The population is 8,481 (2020 est.) in an area of 1308.19 km². The elevation is 385 m. The municipality was founded in 1993.

References

External links
  http://www.citybrazil.com.br/sp/stoantonioaracangua/

Municipalities in São Paulo (state)
1993 establishments in Brazil